Checkley is a civil parish in the district of Staffordshire Moorlands, Staffordshire, England. It contains 58 listed buildings that are recorded in the National Heritage List for England. Of these, one is listed at Grade I, the highest of the three grades, four are at Grade II*, the middle grade, and the others are at Grade II, the lowest grade.  The parish contains the villages of Checkley, Fole, Hollington, Upper Tean, and Lower Tean and the surrounding countryside.  Most of the listed buildings are houses and associated structures, cottages, farmhouses and farm buildings.  The other listed buildings include churches and related structures, a country house and associated items, bridges, a tape weaving factory, mileposts, and a folly.


Key

Buildings

References

Citations

Sources

Lists of listed buildings in Staffordshire